After the Truth is a 1999 German film depicting the fictional trial of Dr. Josef Mengele, known as the "death angel of Auschwitz".
The film, starring Götz George as Mengele and Kai Wiesinger as his lawyer, is based on the original English-language screenplay by American writers Christopher and Kathleen Riley. The German title translates to "Nothing but the truth".

Synopsis
The infamous Nazi doctor Josef Mengele, who performed unethical medical experiments and is considered to be personally responsible for the selection of mass groups of detainees to be murdered in the gas chambers at the Auschwitz concentration camp, comes back from his hideout in Argentina as an 87-year-old man who is in his last days. Back in Germany, he must face trial for his crimes. Peter Rohm, a young solicitor and expert on Mengele, has to defend him. But Rohm feels unable to do so; when he decides to take on the case he endangers not only the relationship to his wife but also their very lives.

While the entire world looks on the Mengele trial, Rohm learns that the history of his own family has a closer connection with the Nazis' genocide than he ever had suspected.

Production
Götz George was also a co-producer of the film, which had problems finding financial support. The actor invested heavily to see the film completed.

Cast
 Kai Wiesinger as Peter Rohm
 Götz George as Josef Mengele
 Karoline Eichhorn as Rebekka Rohm
 Doris Schade as Hilde Rohm
 Peter Roggisch as Chief Prosecutor Heribert Vogt
 Bastian Trost as Felix Hillmann
 Peter Rühring as Dr. Füglein
 Michaela Rosen as Judge Gunda Friedrichs
 Traugott Buhre as Dabrowski
 Stephan Schwartz as Daniel Ginsberg
 Heinz Trixner as Müller
 Detlef Bothe as Siebert
 Volker Risch as Prosecutor
 Frank Röth as Wendler
 Peer Martiny as Adlatus Vogt
 Jockel Tschiersch as Commissioner Wichmann
 Michael Schenk as Judge Kürten

Further reading

External links
 

 Screenwriters' website with press quotes and festival history

1999 films
1999 drama films
German drama films
1990s German-language films
World War II war crimes trials films
Films about the aftermath of the Holocaust
Films about Nazis
Cultural depictions of Josef Mengele
Films scored by Harald Kloser
1990s German films